The 1959–60 Mexican Segunda División was the tenth season of the Mexican Segunda División. The season started on 19 July 1959 and concluded on 20 March 1960. It was won by Monterrey, which became the first club to win two championships in this category.

Changes 
 Tampico was promoted to Primera División
 Cuautla was relegated from Primera División.
 Ciudad Victoria, Orizaba, Tepic and Valladolid joined the league.
 Durango, San José and San Sebastián have dissolved.
 Municipal was renamed as Irapuatense.
 Oviedo was relocated from Tlalnepantla de Baz to Texcoco.
 Due to budget problems on March 7, 1960, between weeks 32 and 33, Nuevo León was acquired by Universidad Autónoma de Nuevo León and renamed as U. de N.L.

Teams

League table

Results

References 

1959–60 in Mexican football
Segunda División de México seasons